Bandar Charak Rural District is a rural district (dehestan) in the Shibkaveh District of Bandar Lengeh County, Hormozgan Province, Iran. At the 2006 census, its population was 4,435, in 798 families.  The rural district has 20 villages.

References 

Rural Districts of Hormozgan Province
Bandar Lengeh County